The name Polo has been used for five tropical cyclones in the Eastern Pacific Ocean.

 Hurricane Polo (1984), a Category 3 hurricane that struck southern Baja California as a tropical depression 
 Hurricane Polo (1990), a low-end Category 1 hurricane that remained at sea
 Tropical Storm Polo (2008), a tropical storm that did not threaten land
 Hurricane Polo (2014), a Category 1 hurricane that paralleled the Mexican coastline but did not make landfall
 Tropical Storm Polo (2020), a weak late-season tropical storm that remained at sea

Pacific hurricane set index articles